Eduard "Edi" Bauer (13 February 1894 – 4 March 1948) was an Austrian international footballer and coach.

Honours

Player
Rapid Wien
Bundesliga (8): 1911–12, 1912–13, 1915–16, 1916–17, 1918–19, 1919–20, 1920–21, 1922–23
Austrian Cup (2): 1918–19, 1919–20
Individual
Bundesliga top scorer (2): 1916–17, 1917–18

Manager
Rapid Wien
Bundesliga (3): 1928–29, 1929–30, 1934–35
Austrian Cup (1): 1926–27
Rapid București
Cupa României (2): 1936–37, 1937–38

References

1894 births
1948 deaths
Footballers from Vienna
Austrian footballers
Association football forwards
Austria international footballers
Austrian football managers
Austrian expatriate football managers
Austrian expatriate sportspeople in Romania
Expatriate football managers in Romania
Expatriate football managers in Germany
SK Rapid Wien players
SK Rapid Wien managers
FC Rapid București managers
Austria national football team managers
Burials at Ottakring Cemetery